Dragon Drive: D-Masters Shot is a third-person shooter video game released in 2003 by Treasure Co. Ltd. The game is based on the Dragon Drive series and was only released in Japan.

Gameplay
Dragon Drive was an aerial combat game, set primarily in large, outdoor arenas where players had to face several waves of enemies. With multi-directional dash and lock on abilities, the game has sometimes drawn comparisons to the Zone of the Enders series.

The game also has a handful of rail shooter levels, drawing frequent comparisons to Sega's Panzer Dragoon series, but these comprise only a very small portion of the game.

Reception

External links
 

2003 video games
Bandai games
Video games about dragons
GameCube-only games
GameCube games
Japan-exclusive video games
Third-person shooters
Video games based on anime and manga
Video games developed in Japan
Multiplayer and single-player video games